Cazzano Sant'Andrea is a comune (municipality) in the Province of Bergamo in the Italian region of Lombardy, located about  northeast of Milan and about  northeast of Bergamo.

Cazzano Sant'Andrea borders the following municipalities: Casnigo, Cene, Gandino, Leffe.

References